Robert L. Burhans (September 19, 1916 – January 16, 2002) was an American lawyer and politician.

Burhans was born in Peoria, Illinois. He received his bachelor's and law degrees from University of Michigan in 1936 and 1939. Burhans was admitted to the Illinois bar in 1939 and practiced law in Peoria. Burhans served in the United States Navy during World War II. Burhans served in the Illinois House of Representatives from 1949 to 1965 and was a Republican. He died at Apostolic Christian Skyways in Peoria, Illinois.

Notes

1916 births
2002 deaths
Politicians from Peoria, Illinois
Military personnel from Illinois
University of Michigan Law School alumni
Illinois lawyers
Republican Party members of the Illinois House of Representatives
United States Navy personnel of World War II
20th-century American politicians